Bertrand Edward Dawson, 1st Viscount Dawson of Penn,  (9 March 1864 – 7 March 1945) was a physician to the British Royal Family and President of the Royal College of Physicians from 1931 to 1937. He is known for his responsibility in the death of George V, who under his care was injected with a fatal dose of cocaine and morphine to hasten his death.

Early life and education
Dawson was born in Croydon, the son of Henry Dawson, of Purley, an architect.

He entered St Paul's School in London in 1877 and University College London in 1879, graduating in 1888 with a Bachelor of Science (BSc) degree. He graduated from the Royal London Hospital in 1893 with a Doctor of Medicine (MD) degree.

Career
After graduation he was registered as a Member of the Royal College of Surgeons (MRCS) in 1890 and invested as a Fellow of the Royal College of Physicians (FRCP) in 1903, and worked as a physician for several years. In 1907, Dawson joined the Royal Household as a physician-extraordinary to King Edward VII, an office he held until 1910, when he was promoted to a physician-in-ordinary under King George V until 1914. He was appointed Knight Commander of the Royal Victorian Order (KCVO) in 1911. Following the outbreak of World War I, he was given the rank of colonel in the Royal Army Medical Corps in November 1914. He served on the Western Front in France from 1915 to 1919, rising to the rank of major-general (he had served as a Royal Army Medical Corps officer in the Territorial Force for many years), noticing the poor physical fitness of British troops and conducting research into trench fever. He was mentioned in dispatches.

He held the office of Physician-in-Ordinary to King George V until 1936 and was appointed Knight of Grace in the Venerable Order of Saint John and Companion of the Order of the Bath (CB) in 1916, Knight Grand Cross of the Royal Victorian Order (GCVO) in the 1918 New Year Honours, and Knight Commander of the Order of St Michael and St George (KCMG) in 1919.

Report on the Future Provision of Medical and Allied Services
Dawson was commissioned whilst he was Chairman of the Consultative Council on Medical and Allied Services in 1919 by Christopher Addison, the first British Minister of Health to produce a report on "schemes requisite for the systematised provision of such forms of medical and allied services as should, in the opinion of the Council, be available for the inhabitants of a given area". An Interim Report on the Future Provision of Medical and Allied Services was produced in 1920, though no further report ever appeared. The report laid down details plans for a network of Primary and Secondary Health Centres, together with architectural drawings of different sorts of centres.  The report was very influential in debates about the National Health Service when it was set up in 1948.

Titles
In the 1920 New Year Honours, he was elevated to the peerage as Baron Dawson of Penn, of Penn, in the County of Buckinghamshire and became an active member of the House of Lords. In April 1926 he was appointed Knight Commander of the Order of the Bath (KCB), and he was appointed to the Privy Council in the 1929 Birthday Honours.

He held the office of President of the Royal Society of Medicine from 1928 to 1930 and President of the Royal College of Physicians from 1931 to 1937.

Death of George V
On the night of 20 January 1936, King George V was close to death; his physicians issued a bulletin with the words "The King's life is moving peacefully towards its close." Dawson's private diary, unearthed after his death and made public in 1986, reveals that the King's last words, a mumbled "God damn you!", were addressed to his nurse, Catherine Black, when she gave him a sedative that night. Dawson, who supported the "gentle growth of euthanasia", admitted in the diary that he ended the King's life with a lethal dose of morphine and cocaine:

Dawson said that he acted to preserve the King's dignity, to prevent further strain on the family, and so that the King's death at 11:55 p.m. could be announced in the morning edition of The Times newspaper rather than "less appropriate ... evening journals". To make doubly sure that this would happen Dawson telephoned his wife in London asking her to let The Times know when the announcement was imminent.

When this appeared in The Daily Telegraph a reader wrote in recalling a clerihew in circulation during Dawson's life:

Dawson's public stance on euthanasia was expressed later that year when he opposed a move in the Lords to legalise it because it "belongs to the wisdom and conscience of the medical profession and not to the realm of law". In 1986, the contents of Dawson's diary were made public for the first time, in which he clearly acknowledged what he had done—which was described by a medical reviewer in 1994 as an arrogant "convenience killing". His actions have also been described as murder.

Further career
In the 1936 Birthday Honours, on 30 October, he was advanced in the peerage as Viscount Dawson of Penn, in the County of Buckingham and remained in the Medical Households of King Edward VIII and King George VI. During the abdication crisis of 1936 Dawson was believed to have attempted to influence the retirement of prime minister Stanley Baldwin on health grounds, thereby to reduce pressure on the king to abdicate. The account of his close colleague William Evans attempts to clear Dawson of any suspicions in this regard:
Dawson was physician and friend to both parties in the feud that was then taking place between the King and the Prime Minister. That Dawson, although initially inclined to the view that Baldwin should retire, eventually pronounced on the Prime Minister's health from medical grounds exclusively, and uninfluenced by either political or moral considerations, was confirmed through his immediate acceptance of a young medical colleague's opinion that the Prime Minister's heart was healthy, which made Baldwin's retirement on the grounds of his unfitness from heart trouble no longer tenable, so that any attempt to dethrone the Prime Minister on that assumption must fail.

Family
Lord Dawson of Penn married Minnie Ethel Yarrow, daughter of Sir Alfred Fernandez Yarrow, 1st Baronet, of Homestead, on 18 December 1900. They had three daughters:
 The Honourable Sybil Frances Dawson (1904 – 2 June 1977), married on 1 October 1929 David Eccles, 1st Viscount Eccles, and had issue
 The Honourable Ursula Margaret Dawson (1907 – 16 November 1999), married on 10 December 1927 Sir Ian Frank Bowater, Lord Mayor of London, and had issue, including Charlotte Mary Bowater, mother of the actor Damian Lewis
 The Honourable Rosemary Monica Dawson (1913 – 13 June 1998), married on 30 November 1939 Sir John Wrightson, 3rd Baronet (19 June 1911 – 1983), and had four children, including Sir Charles Mark Garmondsway Wrightson, 4th Baronet (18 Feb 1951 – ).

Dawson died in March 1945, aged 80. As he had no male heirs, on his death his titles became extinct.

Footnotes

References
 Biography, Oxford Dictionary of National Biography
 Interim report on the Future Provision of Medical and Allied Services (there never was a final report)
 Obituary, The Times, 8 March 1945
 St Paul's School
 L. G. Pine, The New Extinct Peerage 1884–1971: Containing Extinct, Abeyant, Dormant and Suspended Peerages With Genealogies and Arms (London, U.K.: Heraldry Today, 1972), pages 98 and 99.
 Charles Mosley, editor, Burke's Peerage, Baronetage & Knightage, 107th edition, 3 volumes (Wilmington, Delaware, U.S.A.: Burke's Peerage (Genealogical Books) Ltd, 2003), volume 1, page 456.
 Matthew H.C.G., editor, Dictionary of National Biography on CD-ROM (Oxford, U.K.: Oxford University Press, 1995).
 Bertrand Dawson archive collection, Wellcome Library finding aid.
 G. H. Brown, Obituary, The Roll of the Royal College of Physicians, volume 4, page 446.

External links

 
 

1864 births
1945 deaths
People from Croydon
19th-century English medical doctors
Knights Commander of the Order of the Bath
Knights Commander of the Order of St Michael and St George
Knights Grand Cross of the Royal Victorian Order
Knights of Grace of the Order of St John
People educated at St Paul's School, London
Alumni of University College London
Members of the Privy Council of the United Kingdom
British Army generals of World War I
Royal Army Medical Corps officers
Euthanasia in the United Kingdom
Physicians-in-Ordinary
Fellows of the Royal College of Physicians
Viscounts in the Peerage of the United Kingdom
20th-century English medical doctors
Presidents of the Royal College of Physicians
Presidents of the Royal Society of Medicine
Barons created by George V
Peers created by Edward VIII
British Army major generals
Military personnel from London